The Fallen Timbers Battlefield was the site of the Battle of Fallen Timbers on 20 August 1794. The battle, a decisive American victory over Native American and British opponents, effectively ended the Northwest Indian War, securing the Old Northwest for settlement. An area believed to be the battle site, located in Maumee, Ohio, was declared a National Historic Landmark in 1960. The National Historic Site was established in 1999 as a partnership between the National Park Service, Toledo MetroParks, and the Ohio Historical Society.

Setting
The battlefield site is a parcel  in size, located in southwestern Maumee, bounded by Interstate 475 to the east, United States Route 24 to the south, Jerome Road to the west, and a railroad right of way south of Monclova Road to the north.  Most of the area is relatively flat and open, except for the central area, which is a heavily wooded ravine that was a major feature of the terrain that influenced the course of the battle.

The site was relatively undisturbed for most of its time after the battle, seeing logging and some agricultural activity.  The ravine was apparently left undisturbed due to the difficulty of its terrain.  The battlefield area was identified by an archaeological survey in 1995, and further investigation in 2001 identified the locations of the battle lines and other features.

State Memorial
The state memorial is located south of the national historic site, between US 24 and the Maumee River. The principal features of the site are three commemorative items: the Battle of Fallen Timbers Monument, installed in 1929, a plaque listing the United States Army soldiers who fought in the battle, and Turkey Foot Rock. The latter is a boulder on which a turkey foot has been carved, supposedly marking the place where Ottawa chief Turkey Foot was slain. It has been moved from its original location at the base of Presque Isle Hill, two miles south of Maumee City and four miles south of the site of Fort Miamis. From what we now know about the location of the battle, that location was not within the battlefield.

Although this site was designated a National Historic Landmark in 1960, an updated landmark nomination is being prepared to correct the boundaries to include the actual battlefield site.

See also
List of National Historic Landmarks in Ohio
National Register of Historic Places listings in Lucas County, Ohio

Gallery

References

External links
 Fallen Timbers Battlefield National Historic Site
 Fallen Timbers Battlefield and Fort Miamis National Historic Site, National Park Service

Northwest Indian War
National Historic Landmarks in Ohio
Parks in Ohio
Protected areas of Lucas County, Ohio
National Register of Historic Places in Lucas County, Ohio
Conflict sites on the National Register of Historic Places in Ohio
Metroparks Toledo